Cimini may refer to
 Monti Cimini, a range of volcanic hills near Rome, Italy
Cimini (surname)
Cimino family (also Simini) in Italy

See also
Cimino (disambiguation)